Gobichettipalayam is the Selection grade municipality in the Indian state of Tamil Nadu. It is the administrative headquarters of Gobichettipalayam taluk. Agriculture and textile industries contribute majorly to the economy of the town and is popularly known as the rice bowl of western Tamil Nadu.

The town is a part of Gobichettipalayam constituency and elects its member of legislative assembly every five years, and a part of the Tirupur constituency that elects its member of parliament. The town is administered by a municipality established in 1949 and has a population of 65,238 as of 2011. It is known as " Mini Kollywood" because of the film shooting that takes place here and many films in Tamil and other languages have been shot.

History
A major part of present Gobichettipalayam was previously known as "Veerapandi Gramam", and documents and records still use that name. The town was part of the country ruled by king Vēl Pāri, who is regarded as one of the Kadai ēzhu vallal (the last seven great patrons). Pariyur, a temple town near Gobichettipalayam was named after him. The land was later ruled by the Cheras and Vijayanagara empire with the town deriving its name after Gobi Chetti, a Vijayanagara Polygar. It was captured by Tipu Sultan and after Tipu's defeat, British annexed it to their territory.

Demographics
According to 2011 census, Gobichettipalayam had a population of 65,238 with a sex-ratio of 1,062 females for every 1,000 males, much above the national average of 929. A total of 4,669 were under the age of six, constituting 2,364 males and 2,305 females. Scheduled Castes and Scheduled Tribes accounted for 10.74% and 0.08% of the population respectively. The average literacy of the city was 78.52%, compared to the national average of 72.99%. The city had a total of 17064 households. There were a total of 25,225 workers, comprising 512 cultivators, 2,035 main agricultural labourers, 637 in house hold industries, 21,070 other workers, 971 marginal workers, 15 marginal cultivators, 308 marginal agricultural labourers, 57 marginal workers in household industries and 591 other marginal workers.

The population is dominated by the Kongu Vellalar community. There are a significant number of  Senguntha Mudaliars, Vanniyars, Dalits, Nadars and Vettuva Gounders. As per the religious census of 2011, Gobichettipalayam had 90.3% Hindus, 7.1% Muslims, 2.5% Christians and 0.1% others.

Administration
Gobichettipalayam Municipality was constituted on 1 October 1949 as III grade as per G.O. Ms. No. 1948 (Local Administration Department) dated 12 August 1949 with effect from 1 October 1949 and was elevated to Grade II as per G.O. Ms. No. 194 (Local Administration Department) dated 10 February 1970 and to first Grade with effect from 1 October 1977 as per G.O. Ms. No. 1532 (R.D & L.A.), 21 September 1977, and to Selection Grade as per G.O. Ms. No. 238 (MA&WS), 2 December 2008.

Politics
The town elects a Member to the legislative assembly. It is currently represented by education minister K. A. Sengottaiyan of AIADMK. Gobichettipalayam was a parliamentary constituency until 2009 and was replaced by the newly formed Tirupur constituency during delimitation by Election Commission of India. After the delimination, Gobichettipalayam assembly constituency is part of the Tirupur constituency.

Transport
The town is well connected by roads with the following arterial roads connecting with other major towns:
State Highway 81, State Highway 15, State Highway 15A. The Tamil Nadu State Transport Corporation has a depot and was in possession of 1,218 buses as of 31 March 2005. Originally known as Jeeva Transport Corporation (JTC), it came into being by the bifurcation of Cheran Transport Corporation and later became part of Coimbatore division of TNSTC. Buses ply to all major towns and cities within Tamil Nadu and neighboring state of Karnataka. KSRTC buses also connect to the town due to its proximity to Karnataka.

A proposal to construct a railway line connecting Mysore with Erode via Gobichettipalayam was mooted during the British rule in 1915. Four official surveys were made in 1922, 1936, 1942 and as recently as 2008, but the plan failed to take off due to the concerns of railway line passing through the Sathyamangalam Wildlife Sanctuary. The airport has regular flights from/to major domestic destinations and international destinations like Sharjah and Singapore.

Geography and climate

Western Ghats forms the border of the region resulting several hill locks and Bhavani River traverses across the region. The temperature is moderately warm in Gobichettipalayam, except during the summer months when it is very hot. Rainfall is moderate to high, unpredictable and unevenly distributed. The average annual Rainfall of Gobichettipalayam is 92cms. The soil mainly consists of black loam, red loam and red sand. In general, the soil in and around the city is fertile and good for agriculture purposes and the surrounding water logged rice fields contribute to the high humidity levels.

Education

Gobichettipalayam has a good educational infrastructure. Notable schools are Diamond Jubilee Higher Secondary School, established over a 100 years ago and visited by Mahatma Gandhi and Shree Vidyalaya, which has a full-time dyslexic center. The city is also home to Gobi Arts and Science College, one of the oldest arts colleges in the state. The city itself has only a few engineering colleges, but its proximity to Coimbatore and Erode makes it an ideal educational hub.

Economy
The city is developing quickly and has been described by the government as "Bi-functional", with 31% of the work force engaged in agriculture, 56% in trading and other activities and 13% in industry. A number of banks have been established in the town in recent years, testimony to the growth and prosperity of the local economy. ICICI Bank established its third branch in Tamil Nadu here. The economy is predominantly dependent on agriculture.

The economy of Gobichettipalayam centers on agriculture, with paddy, sugarcane, plantain, tobacco and turmeric being the principal crops. The taluk is known for its lush green paddy fields which attracts cine industry. Gobichettipalayam is well known for its plantain cultivation and the production of coconuts. There are regulated market places run by the Government of India for the trade of agricultural products mainly turmeric, copra and bananas.

Gobichettipalayam is one of the leading producers of silk cocoon in the country. Mulberry cultivation has increased in the recent years and a silk research extension center was established by the Government of Tamil Nadu in collaboration with the Central Silk Board. India's second automated silk reeling unit was established in here in 2008.

A large number of spinning mills have come up in to support to the weaving and knitwear to supplement Tirupur. IT and BPO sectors are  also developing with a few start up companies based out of the town. Other industries include cotton textiles, motors, pumps, automobile spares, textile machinery manufacturing, castings and machined parts.

Culture
Kongu Tamil, a dialect of Tamil is the language spoken by majority of the people. English is used as an official language along with Tamil. Other languages spoken include Malayalam, Kannada and Telugu. Gobichettipalayam cuisine is predominantly south Indian with rice as its base. Most locals still retain their rural tradition, with many restaurants still serving food on a banana leaf. North Indian, Chinese and continental cuisines are also available. mysorepa (a sweet made from lentil flour) and halwa (a sweet made of different ingredients such as milk, wheat or rice) are famous. Idly, dosa, vada-sambar and biryani are popular among the locals. Coffee shops and chat centers cater to young people. Karupatti, coconut milk are famous.

Notable people
 K. M. MuthuVellappa Gounder
 G. S. Lakshman Iyer, freedom fighter and philanthropist
 K. S. Ramaswamy Gounder, freedom fighter and former union minister
 S. M. Palaniappan, former Member of Legislative Assembly
 A. V. Ilango, writer and artist
 K. Bhagyaraj, film actor and director
 K. A. Sengottaiyan, Minister of School Education, Sports and Youth Welfare, Government of Tamil Nadu
 G. V. Loganathan, former professor at Virginia tech killed in Virginia Tech shooting
Deva Sangeeth, Indian Tamil writer (Aanaikkadu)

Places of interest

 Kodiveri Dam
 Pachaimalai Subramanya Swamy Temple
 Pariyur Kondathu Kaliamman Temple
 Gobi Arts College
 Gunderipallam Dam
 Amala School
 Perumpallam Dam

See also
 List of Educational Institutions in Gobichettipalayam
 Gobichettipalayam (Lok Sabha constituency)
 Gobichettipalayam Municipal Corporation
 Velliangattu Pudhur

References

External links

 

 
Cities and towns in Erode district